Burrinjuck Dam is a heritage-listed major gated concrete-walled gravity  hydro-electric dam at Burrinjuck, Yass Valley Shire, New South Wales, Australia. It has three spillways across the Murrumbidgee River located in the South West Slopes region of New South Wales, Australia. The dam's purpose includes flood mitigation, hydro-power, irrigation, water supply and conservation. The impounded reservoir is called Lake Burrinjuck. It was designed by Lawrence Augustus Burton Wade (of the New South Wales Public Works Department) and built from 1907 to 1927 by Lane & Peters, Sydney. It is also known as Barren Jack Dam and Barrenjack. The property was owned by Department of Planning and Infrastructure (State Government). It was added to the New South Wales State Heritage Register on 2 April 1999.

In March 2018 Meridian Energy Australia purchased GSP Energy Pty Ltd which included the Hume, Burrinjuck and Keepit Power Stations. These were previously Green State Power Hydro Assets. In October 2019 Meridian announced a proposal to increase station capacity by 50 megawatts.

The dam was built by the New South Wales Water, Conservation & Irrigation Commission and the NSW Department of Public Works for town water supplies, river flows and domestic requirements, irrigated agriculture, industry, flood mitigation and environmental flows. The Yass and Goodradigbee rivers also flow into the dam. Together with releases from Blowering Dam, on the Tumut River, Burrinjuck Dam also provides a regulated flow of water for the Coleambally and Murrumbidgee Irrigation Areas. The dam divides the upper and lower catchment of the Murrumbidgee River and is the headwater storage for the Murrumbidgee Irrigation Area.

History

Concept
The pastoralist Samuel McCaughey accumulated hundreds of thousands of hectares in the Riverina after owning his first property in 1864. He had an interest in water conservation that led him to construct a series of irrigation channels and steam pumps that were critical to the rice-growing activities in the area at the turn of the century. The New South Wales government liked his ideas so much they agreed to build a larger dam.

Initial construction

The announcement for the construction of the dam was made 26 November 1906 via a resolution made by the New South Wales Legislative Assembly in regards to, "the Barren Jack Storage Reservoir and Northern Murrumbidgee Irrigation Scheme".

Construction commenced in 1907. Prior to about February 1911, the dam was known as Barren Jack, a corruption of the Aboriginal name of the locality. A  narrow gauge railway was constructed from the New South Wales Government Railways' Main Southern Line at Goondah to bring materials to the site.

Delays were experienced throughout the construction period. Problems were found in part of the foundations of the dam wall in 1911, which led to a 12-month delay in completion of the first stage of the construction works. Delays were caused by World War I, construction of extensions to the spillways, and the fact that deep foundations were necessary.

The flood waters tore through the unfinished southern spillway and fell  to the river below, resulting in a massive fog which one journalist compared to that of Niagara Falls. The flood water came within  of spilling into the finished northern spillway, which was being used as a storage site for sand and granite used in the dam's construction. Had the water entered the northern spillway, the construction materials, worth £25,000, would have been swept away.

Due to World War I, the dam was not completed until 1928. At the end of 1927, £1,712,730 had been spent on construction work, excluding the cost of the hydroelectric facilities.

Enlargement and remedial works
In 1937, it was discovered that the dam had developed a structural weakness that required remedial action. The weakness was not due to a design flaw per se; rather it was due to strains and stresses that were not scientifically understood at the time the dam was designed. The New South Wales Government brought in dam engineering expert Professor P.G. Hornell from Sweden to report on the defects that had developed in the dam.

Apparently there were real fears of the dam wall bursting, so detailed plans were prepared for the evacuation of 20,000 people in the Murrumbidgee basin downstream of the dam in the event that the dam wall failed. The State Government played down these fears and felt that the evacuation plans would never have to be used. In the event of a catastrophic failure of the dam wall, it was anticipated that flood waters would reach Jugiong within an hour, Gundagai within 90 minutes, Wagga Wagga in six hours and Narrandera in 22 hours. Arrangements were made with police, the New South Wales Government Railways, the postal service, military and air force officials, radio stations, boat operators and local committees to be put into effect at a moments' notice.

Remediation work was carried out between 1937 and 1957. The remediation work was authorised by the NSW Cabinet around January 1939, and at the time was anticipated to cost more than £1,000,000.

In 1941, the State Government appointed a committee to estimate the probability of the dam flooding. This flood probability was used by consulting engineers to estimate the cost of the remediation work. The engineers estimated the remedial work would cost £1,800,000 but according to Government experts this figure was likely to be substantially exceeded.

In February 1951 a fire destroyed some of the workshops at the construction site. The compressing room, machine shop and first-aid surgery were the worst affected, and much of their contents were destroyed. The damage was estimated to cost between £50,000 and £100,000.

A major flood in 1974 eroded unweathered granite from an unlined spillway discharge channel which then resulted in the destruction of a penstock to the Burrinjuck Power Station. The outlet valves of the dam were also destroyed during the same flood. These events prompted a review of the safety of the dam which recommended a new remedial works program.

Deaths
At 8 A.M. on Thursday morning of 19 October 1950, 9 men plunged to their deaths after a platform collapsed unexpectedly. The men were pulled into the spillway. They were pulling wires to open the southern spillway in order to alleviate floodwaters when the platform they were working from collapsed. 8 out of 9 of the men's bodies were found. Mr. Frank Lloyd Barton's body was found a mile down the river from the dam. The other 8 men were Frederick Rule, Frederick Basham, James Chant, James Fillery, Robert Elliott, Reginald Lippiatt, Peter Steinmanis, and Eugene Podusteanu. There was a 10th man, Bruce Grieves, working as well but he survived the accident because he had one leg off the platform and managed to pull back when the platform gave way.

Upgrade
At the time, the project was unprecedented in two respects:

the post-tensioning force required per metre length of dam crest and,
the intensity of the flood discharge over the unlined sections of the side channel spillways during the Probable Maximum Flood (PMF).

The upgrading works were completed in 1999 at a cost of A$79.5 million.

Climate

Located on the exposed western slopes of the Brindabella Range, rainfall peaks distinctly in winter. Snow is a rare occurrence at the bottom of the valley, but it does occur annually on the surrounding ranges and hilly country above 600 metres (such as at Wee Jasper); nearby Black Andrew Mountain (935 metres) and Mount Barren Jack (972 metres) overlooking the lake, can be periodically snow-capped during the winter months.

Description 

Journalist E.J. Brady visited the dam site during its construction in 1911 and wrote a detailed description of its progress to that point. He alighted from the southern mail train at Goondah railway station where he was met by the resident engineer on the project, Mr Smith. They then boarded a train on the light rail line which took them 45 kilometres to the temporary township housing 1,000 people, the workers and their families, engaged in constructing the dam. The workforce itself was 400 strong and the monthly wages bill was £3,000. No alcohol was allowed in the township. The dam was expected to take another three years to complete.

Burrinjuck Dam is situated on the Murrumbidgee River 60 km by road from Yass in southern New South Wales.  The dam is part of a larger system of weirs and controls which include that of Blowering Dam and Berembed Weir.  Burrinjuck Dam provides water supplies for the Murrumbidgee Irrigation Area which has a combination of licensed agricultural, irrigation and stock use, with also town and domestic users.  Apart from acting in a regulatory role the dam can also pass water through its 10 megawatt hydro-electric power station thus becoming a very fast and clean supply of electricity.

The dam is a steel reinforced cyclopean concrete gravitation dam. Large rocks known as granite plums were mixed with cyclopean concrete during construction as a cost saving measure. The three sector gates plus two side channel spillways are capable of discharging .

Linked to the dam is a pump house, left and right spillways and a hydro electric power generation system.

Power generation

Ecological impact 
The unnaturally cold water released from the dam, up to  colder than it naturally should be, is believed to have directly contributed to the disappearance of the freshwater catfish from the Murrumbidgee between Burrinjuck and Wagga Wagga.

Heritage listing 
The dam is an example of how applied modern technology has been used to meet the demand of an expanding rural area.  The dam was part of a larger system of weirs and controls providing water for the government-sponsored Murrumbidgee Irrigation Scheme which enabled agriculture to expand in the area.  It is the first major water storage built specially for irrigation purposes in NSW.  The dam is also part of the New South Wales's first hydro-electric scheme.

Burrinjuck Dam was listed on the New South Wales State Heritage Register on 2 April 1999.

It is listed as a National Engineering Landmark by Engineers Australia as part of the Engineering Heritage Recognition Program.

See also 

 Greater Burrinjuck Dam Site
 Barren Jack Creek Water Supply Dam
 Burrinjuck Power Station
 List of dams and reservoirs in New South Wales

References

Bibliography

Attribution

External links

 
 Burrinjuck Dam Fishing Information & Map
 Richard Woodward's Dam Projects
 Burrinjuck Waters State Park
 Water levels

Murrumbidgee River
River regulation in Australia
Dams completed in 1928
Gravity dams
Hydroelectric power stations in New South Wales
Dams in the Murray River basin
Dams in New South Wales
1928 establishments in Australia
Burrinjuck, New South Wales
New South Wales State Heritage Register
Recipients of Engineers Australia engineering heritage markers